Scott Sowerby is a Canadian historian and Associate Professor in the Department of History, Northwestern University.

He was awarded a PhD from Harvard University in 2006. His book Making Toleration: The Repealers and the Glorious Revolution was awarded the Royal Historical Society's The Whitfield Prize and was shortlisted for Phi Beta Kappa Society's Ralph Waldo Emerson Award. The book is about James II of England's allies in repealing penal laws against religious minorities (such as the Dissenters and Catholics), a group Sowerby labels the Repealers.

Works

Making Toleration: The Repealers and the Glorious Revolution (Harvard University Press, 2013).

Notes

External links
Sowerby's research page

Living people
21st-century Canadian historians
Canadian male non-fiction writers
Harvard University alumni
Northwestern University faculty
Year of birth missing (living people)